Sakamoto Dam is a dam in the Gunma Prefecture of Japan. It forms Lake Usui.

Dams in Gunma Prefecture
Dams completed in 1994